Sutton SignWriting is a Unicode block containing characters used in SignWriting, a system for writing sign languages that was developed by Valerie Sutton in 1974.

Block

History
The following Unicode-related documents record the purpose and process of defining specific characters in the Sutton SignWriting block:

See also
 Sutton SignWriting

External links
 
 SignWriting Character Viewer (Unicode 8)

References 

Unicode blocks